The 2005 Utah State Aggies football team represented Utah State University as a member of the Western Athletic Conference (WAC) in 2005 NCAA Division I-A football season. The Aggies were led by first-year head coach Brent Guy and played their home games in Romney Stadium in Logan, Utah. The Aggies finished the season 3–8 overall and  2–6 in WAC play to tie for sixth place.

Schedule

References

Utah State
Utah State Aggies football seasons
Utah State Aggies football